The following article presents a summary of the 2004 football (soccer) season in Paraguay.

First division results
The first division tournament was divided in two sections: the Apertura and the Clausura and had 10 teams participating in a two round all-play-all system. The team with the most points at the end of the two rounds was crowned as the champion.

Torneo Apertura

Torneo Clausura

Championship game playoff
Since Cerro Porteño won both the Apertura and Clausura tournaments they were declared as the national champions and there was no playoff game as a result.

Relegation / Promotion
 Sport Colombia and Sol de América automatically relegated to the second division after finishing last and second-to-last in the average points table over a three-year period.
 3 de Febrero and General Caballero ZC promoted to the first division by finishing first and second respectively in the second division tournament.

Qualification to international competitions
Cerro Porteño qualified to the 2005 Copa Libertadores by winning the Torneo Apertura and Torneo Clausura; and to the 2004 Copa Sudamericana by winning the 2004 Copa Sudamericana Qualifier.
Libertad qualified to the 2005 Copa Libertadores by finishing second in the aggregate points table, and to the 2004 Copa Sudamericana by finishing in second place in the Torneo Apertura.
Tacuary qualified to the 2005 Copa Libertadores as the second-best finisher in the aggregate points table.

Lower divisions results

Paraguayan teams in international competitions
Copa Libertadores 2004:
Olimpia: group-stage
Libertad: group-stage
Club Guaraní: group-stage
Copa Sudamericana 2004:
Cerro Porteño: quarter-finals
Libertad: preliminary first round

Paraguay national team
The following table lists all the games played by the Paraguay national football team in official competitions during 2004.

References
 Paraguay 2004 by Eli Schmerler and Juan Pablo Andrés at RSSSF
 Diario ABC Color

 
Seasons in Paraguayan football
Paraguay 2004